Brandon Bolden (born January 26, 1990) is an American football running back for the Las Vegas Raiders of the National Football League (NFL). He played college football at Ole Miss. He was signed as an undrafted free agent in 2012 by the New England Patriots, where he played nine non-consecutive seasons. Primarily utilized as a special teams player, Bolden was a member of two Super Bowl-winning teams with New England. In between his two Patriots stints, he played for the Miami Dolphins in 2018. Bolden left the Patriots a second time to join the Raiders in 2022.

Early life
Bolden attended Scotlandville Magnet High School in Baton Rouge, Louisiana. As a senior, Bolden rushed for 886 yards and 12 touchdowns en route to being named First-team All-District 5-5A. He also caught 12 passes for 256 yards. SuperPrep named him SuperPrep All-Region and ranked him the No. 34 best player in Louisiana. Bolden was named the No. 93 best running back in the nation by Scout.com. He was heavily recruited by Les Miles and LSU, but ultimately decided to play for Houston Nutt at Ole Miss.

College career
Although fellow running back Enrique Davis was more regarded as a recruit, by his sophomore year, Bolden had gained the starting role for the Rebels. In the 2009 season, he finished with 129 carries for 614 yards and four touchdowns. In the 2010 season, Bolden averaged nearly six yards a carry. Against BYU in the first game of the 2011 season, Bolden suffered a broken ankle. Although the fracture was a minor one and he only missed a few games, he never returned to his previous form. He finished the 2011 season with 96 carries for 472 yards and four touchdowns. He was not selected in the 2012 NFL Draft, although some sites predicted he might be drafted in one of the later rounds. Although Bleacher Report reported on April 30, 2012, that he had agreed to a free agent contract with the Washington Redskins, Bolden later tweeted that the report was false. On May 2, 2012, a New York Times blog reported that he had signed a free agent deal with the New England Patriots.

Collegiate statistics

Professional career

New England Patriots (2012–2017)
During the 2012 preseason, Bolden had 36 carries for 128 yards and caught four passes, but fumbled the ball twice, losing one. Nevertheless, at the end of training camp, the New England Patriots elected to keep Bolden on their 53-man roster, rather than try to place him on their practice squad. He scored his first touchdown in the Patriots' Week 3 loss to the Baltimore Ravens; in Week 4, he led the Patriots with 137 yards on 16 carries—an average of 8.6 yards per carry. He scored one touchdown and added an 11-yard reception. He and Stevan Ridley, who had 106 yards on 22 carries with two touchdowns, became the first Patriots running backs to accrue 100 rushing yards in the same game since 1982. Moreover, Wes Welker and Rob Gronkowski had 100-yard games that day as well, making the four only the second such quartet of two 100-yard rushers and two 100-yard receivers in a single game for the same team. For his efforts, Bolden was named the NFL's FedEx Ground Player of the Week for Week 4. On November 9, 2012, Bolden was suspended four games for violating the NFL's policy on performance-enhancing substances. Overall, he finished the 2012 season with 56 carries for 274 yards and two touchdowns. Bolden was active for 12 of the Patriots' games during the 2013 season and finished the year with 271 rushing yards, 3 rushing touchdowns and 4.9 yards per carry; he also had 152 receiving yards.

Bolden was a part of the Patriots Super Bowl XLIX championship team when they defeated the Seattle Seahawks, 28–24, and played in all 19 of the Patriots regular-season and postseason games. On January 9, 2015, Bolden was signed to a two-year extension by the Patriots. On November 9, 2015, Bolden caught his first touchdown pass, an 18-yarder from Tom Brady, against the Washington Redskins. On November 29, Bolden caught his second touchdown pass on a 63-yard catch-and-run in a loss to the Denver Broncos. In the 2016 season, Bolden went back to a reserve role on offense and played mostly on special teams. On February 5, 2017, Bolden was part of the Patriots team that won Super Bowl LI. In the game, he played only on special teams as the Patriots defeated the Atlanta Falcons by a score of 34–28 in overtime. The Patriots trailed 28–3 in the third quarter, but rallied to win the game, 34–28, in the first overtime game in Super Bowl history and the largest comeback in Super Bowl history.

On April 5, 2017, Bolden re-signed with the Patriots. On September 2, 2017, he was released by the Patriots, but was re-signed two days later. As in 2016, he saw little action as a running back. In the first half of 2017, he saw no carries from the backfield, but served extensively on special teams, serving as a gunner opposite Matthew Slater. Bolden recorded six special teams tackles through Week 9 of 2017.

On February 24, 2018, Bolden signed a one-year contract extension with the Patriots through the 2018 season. On September 1, Bolden was released by the Patriots.

Miami Dolphins (2018) 
On September 4, 2018, Bolden signed with the Miami Dolphins. He recorded 91 rushing yards (54 of which came on one play, which was a career long, against New England in the Miracle in Miami game), two rushing touchdowns, and a receiving touchdown on the 2018 season.

New England Patriots (second stint)

On March 13, 2019, Bolden signed a two-year contract with the New England Patriots. Overall, in the 2019 season, Bolden recorded 15 carries for 68 rushing yards and three rushing touchdowns to go along with nine receptions for 111 receiving yards and one receiving touchdown.

On July 28, 2020, Bolden announced his decision to opt out of the 2020 season, due to concerns over the ongoing COVID-19 pandemic.

In 2021, Bolden had a career-high 405 receiving yards as the Patriots primary third-down back, along with 226 rushing yards.

Las Vegas Raiders 
On March 16, 2022, Bolden signed with the Las Vegas Raiders on a one year deal.

Personal life
Brandon and his wife Arianna have three children together. Their son Brycen was born in May 2011, their daughter Axelle-Masai was born in March 2017, and their youngest daughter Aviana was born in February 2019. The couple was married in June 2014, having been together since 2008 when they both attended Scotlandville Magnet High School.

Bolden's grandfather, Frank Pitts, was a wide receiver who played for the Oakland Raiders in 1974.  Pitts played for the Kansas City Chiefs in Super Bowl I and Super Bowl IV. In 2021, Bolden changed his jersey number from 38 to 25 so Pitts could see his grandson playing in his number.

On December 31, 2021, Bolden revealed that he had battled cancer in 2018. He was diagnosed with epidermoid carcinoma, a form of skin cancer, following the Patriots' loss to the Philadelphia Eagles in Super Bowl LII and temporarily lost function of the right side of his face. He since underwent surgery and is cancer-free.

NFL career statistics

Regular season

References

External links
 Miami Dolphins bio
 Profile at CBS Sports
 Profile at ESPN
 Profile at Yahoo! Sports

Living people
1990 births
Players of American football from Baton Rouge, Louisiana
American football running backs
Ole Miss Rebels football players
New England Patriots players
Miami Dolphins players
Las Vegas Raiders players